John Paul Jones (1747–1792) was a Scottish-American naval commander during the American Revolutionary War.

John Paul Jones may also refer to:

People
 John Paul Jones (artist) (1924–1999), American painter and printmaker
 John Paul Jones (athlete) (1890–1970), previous record holder in the mile run
 John Paul Jones (musician) (born 1946), best known as a member of the English rock group Led Zeppelin
 John Paul Jones (Louisiana politician), state senator in Louisiana
 John Paul DeJoria (born John Paul Jones DeJoria, 1944), American entrepreneur billionaire
 Johnpaul Jones (born 1941), American architect

Fictional characters
Cappie (Captain John Paul Jones), a character from the TV series Greek

Facilities and structures
 John Paul Jones Junior High School, Philadelphia, Pennsylvania, USA; a school building
 John Paul Jones School, an elementary school at Cavite City, Philippines' U.S. Navy's Naval Station Sangley Point
 John Paul Jones Arena, a sports venue at the University of Virginia
 John Paul Jones House, Portsmouth, New Hampshire, USA
 John Paul Jones Cottage Museum, Arbigland Estate, Kirkbean, Kirkcudbrightshire, Dumfries and Galloway, Scotland, UK
 John Paul Jones Memorial Park, Kittery, Maine, USA
 John Paul Jones Park, Fort Hamilton, Bay Ridge, Brooklyn, NYC, NYS, USA

Entertainment
 John Paul Jones (film), a 1959 biographical film about the naval commander
 John Paul Jones, a 2001 musical about the naval commander by Scottish composer Julian Wagstaff
 John Paul Jones, a John Coltrane song off the 1956 Paul Chambers album Chambers' Music

Other uses
 , a U.S. Navy ship; the name of two American destroyers
 Operation John Paul Jones (1966) a U.S.-Vietnam War military operation in Vietnam

See also

 John Paul Jones flag
 John Paul Jones Crypt, United States Naval Academy, Annapolis, Maryland, USA; in the Naval Academy Chapel
 John Paul Jones Memorial, West Potomac Park, Washington, D.C., USA
 John P. Jones (disambiguation)
 John Paul (disambiguation)
 Paul Jones (disambiguation)
 John Jones (disambiguation)
 John (disambiguation)
 Paul (disambiguation)
 Jones (disambiguation)

Jones, John Paul